Gurha Slathia is a village and notified area in the Samba district of the Indian union territory of Jammu and Kashmir. The village is the mother land of some of the bravest men and women born in Jammu and Kashmir. The place is well known for its Amma ka Mandir where the Rajput families unite once a year.

The M.L.A of the village is Mr. Surjjet Singh Slathia. The village is also the birthplace of the famous Bollywood singer Siddarth Slathia. It is better known as the village of Rajputs, it's located at 30 km from south of Jammu.

Demographics 
Gurha  Slathia is the only village in Jammu and Kashmir with a population exceeding 4,600 (4,629 according to a census in 2011). In 1975, 90% of the families living there had at least one member serving in the Indian Army. Gurha Slathia is more urbanized than many og the surrounding villages. There are well maintained two-lane roads, athletic stadiums, playgrounds, hospitals, and schools. There are 8 wards, or Mandi, in Gurha Slathia: Grota Mandi, Ugh Mandi, Garh Mandi, Sani Mandi, Rajgarh Mandi, Paddar Mandi, Dabbar Mandi, and Andrarh Mandi.

The Slathias are Suryavanshi Rajputs that belong to the Dogra region and are mainly found in Jammu, Samba, Udhampur . The Jamwal Clan is made up of sub-clans formed by brothers of the reigning Maharajahs. They settled at various places around Jammu as Rajahs after they were allotted Jagirs. 

The sub-clans include: 

 Jandi Wala
 Panjgrain Wala
 Bhalwal Wala
 Saruinsar Wala
 Raipuria
 Kahna Chak Wala
 Panchor Wala; Jandria
 Purani Mandi Wala
 Sohal Wala
 Agore Wala
 Jagti Wala
 Painthal wa Dansal Wala
 Sahanu wa Taru Wala
 Dalpatia; Narania
 Shobilia; Birpuria
 Balbadria
 Ram Gharia
 Fateh Khania
 Tambar Dahojia
 Manalia
 Kapur Dyalia
 Markalia
 Ala Khania
 Raduwal
 Bahu Wala
 Slathia
 Surkhania
 Dagoria
 Jasrotia
 Lakhanpuria
 Samyal
 Sangramia
 Mankotia
 Udhamolia Jamwalas
 Chillhals
 Deonias

History

Slathia's Raja Hamir Dev ruled the Jammu kingdom between Bikarmi from 1400 to 1423. He had two popular sons: Ajaib Dev and Hasil Dev. The younger son, Hasil Dev, became the Wazir of Raja Ajaib Dev of Jammu kingdom. Raja Ajaib Dev died in Bikarmi in 1454. Wazir Hasil Dev cared for the young prince and helped him with his administrative duties.

The Badshah of Delhi Legend 
According to local legend, Badshah of Delhi, who belonged to the Lodhi or Sadat dynasty, found Beeram Dev charming. Badshah arranged for Beeram Dev to marry his daughter, who had fallen in love at first sight with the Raja Dev of Jamm. He ordered Raja Beeram Dev to convert and commit himself to Islam before the marriage, but the Raja refused to change his religion. However Beeram Dev still wished to marry Badshah's daughter. The Badshah became furious at Raja Beeram Dev's refusal to change his religion.

After Badshah conferred with the Qadi, he ordered Raja Beeram Dev's killing. Wazir Hasil Dev came to Raja Beeram Dev's rescue and asked the Badshah to hand the Beeram Dev to him in order to convince him to convert to Islam and marriage to Badshah's daughter. After playing his hand,  Hasil  Dev sent Raja Beeram Dev back to Jammu in the night along with a few sepoys. Badshah caught hold of Wazir Hasil Dev and scalped him alive. Then Badshah sent his forces to capture Raja Beeram Dev, who was also later killed by Badshah's troops. Wazir Hasil Dev had two sons, Data Ram and Owali. The descendants of Data Ram got Jagir in Mangla (Manawar) and sobriqueted as Mangalia Rajput. The descendants of the younger brother, Owali, settled in village Gurha, later named Gurha Slathian. This group later became known as Slathia Rajputs. Maharaja Gulab Singh later allotted Jagirs in Kashmir to the Manglia Rajputs. The Slathia community was also given Jagirs in Dada Seeba.

References

Villages in Samba district